The 2007 FIBA Europe Under-16 Championship was the 21st edition of the FIBA Europe Under-16 Championship. The cities of Ierapetra, Rethymno and Heraklion, in Greece, hosted the tournament. Serbia won the trophy for the first time since the dissolution of Serbia and Montenegro. Slovenia and Portugal were relegated to Division B.

Competition system
The tournament format changed from previously years. The sixteen teams were allocated in four groups of four teams each. The first three teams in each group qualified for the qualifying round. The last team of each group played for the 13th–16th position in the Classification Games. The twelve teams qualified for the qualifying round were allocated in two groups of six teams each. The results of the games between the teams in the preliminary round were taken into account for the ranking in the qualifying round. The two top teams of each group qualified for the semifinals.

Teams

Preliminary round

Group A

Group B

Group C

Group D

Classification round

Group G

Qualifying round

Group E

Group F

Knockout stage

9th–12th playoffs

5th–8th playoffs

Championship

Final standings

Team roster
Nemanja Jaramaz, Aleksandar Ponjavić, Nikša Nikolić, Aleksandar Obradović, Nikola Vukasović, Stevan Lekić, Danilo Anđušić, Lazar Radosavljević, Bogdan Jovanović, Nikola Rondović, Branislav Đekić, and Dejan Musli.
Head coach: Dragan Vaščanin.

References
FIBA Archive
FIBA Europe Archive

FIBA U16 European Championship
2007–08 in European basketball
2007–08 in Greek basketball
International youth basketball competitions hosted by Greece